Keegan Rhys Daniel (born 5 March 1985) is a South African rugby union player who last played for the  in Super Rugby and in the Currie Cup and the  in the Rugby Challenge.

Born in the rural farming town of Humansdorp, Daniel started his education at Gonubie Primary before moving off to one of South Africa's best known rugby nurseries, Dale College.

Daniel played Craven Week for the  rugby team in 2003 and was recruited afterwards by the Natal Rugby Academy.

Daniel came onto the provincial scene in the Super Rugby competition which earned him a place in the South Africa Under-21 team. Daniel represented them in the 2006 Under 21 Rugby World Championship in France where South Africa lost 24–13 in the final to the hosts. He was nominated for player of the tournament and went on to claim the South African Under-21 Player of the Year for 2006. He has the ability to play flanker, wing, fly-half and fullback because of his blistering speed and good kicking ability.

His first try against the Blues came after just 16 seconds in the game – a record at Super Rugby level.

On 30 October 2010, Daniel was selected to tour with the Springboks in their November tour of England, Ireland, Scotland and Wales. He was not selected as a part of the initial squad of 39 but was later added after his performances in the Currie Cup semi-final and final.

On 16 January 2012, Sharks' coach John Plumtree appointed Daniel as the Sharks captain for the 2012 Super Rugby season.

During the 2014 Super Rugby season, it was revealed that Daniel would join Japanese Top League side Kubota Spears on a two-year deal at the conclusion of the tournament.

References

External links
Sharks Player Profile

itsrugby.co.uk Profile

South African rugby union players
South Africa international rugby union players
Sharks (Currie Cup) players
Sharks (rugby union) players
1985 births
People from Humansdorp
White South African people
South African people of British descent
Living people
Kubota Spears Funabashi Tokyo Bay players
South African expatriate rugby union players
South African expatriate sportspeople in Japan
Expatriate rugby union players in Japan
Rugby union players from the Eastern Cape